East Ridge High School is a school in Clermont, Florida and one of eight public high schools in Lake County. East Ridge is the largest school in Lake County. There are 2,486 Students enrolled as of December 2019.

History
East Ridge High School was constructed at 13322 Excalibur Road in 2002. It is currently the second newest high school in Lake County, Florida. The school was built to stop the overcrowding of their mother, now sister school, South Lake High School, which is located in Groveland. Lake Minneola High School was opened for the fall 2011 semester.

School clubs
The school offers a wide variety of clubs (some clubs listed below are no longer running):

First Priority
HOSA
Robotics (Has a team for FIRST competitions)
Key Club
DECA Marketing Club
FFA
FCCLA
FEA
Culinary Cooking Team
Television Production
Photography
Student Government Association
Knights Marching Band
Color Guard
Concert Band
Winter Guard
Indoor Percussion
Jazz Band
Chorus
National Honor Society
Science National Honor Society
Future Business Leaders of America
Graphic Design
Thespians (Drama)
SGA (Student Government Association)
Tri-M (National Music Honor Society)
Newspaper
 Hi-Q Quiz Bowl Team
Talking Hands Club (Sign Language)
Guitar Club

Notable alumni
Shane Greene, MLB player
Andy Jones, NFL player
Kaylin Whitney, track and field athlete
Chimdi Chekwa, NFL player
Greg Lloyd Jr., NFL player
Stephanie Samedy, volleyball player

References

External links
 Orlando Sentinel
 School Statistics
 Clermont Population
 Clermont Information
 Rankings

High schools in Lake County, Florida
Public high schools in Florida
Educational institutions established in 2002
Clermont, Florida
2002 establishments in Florida